Perevalsk Raion was a raion (district) in the eastern Ukrainian province of Luhansk, Donbas. The administrative center of the raion was the city of Perevalsk.

The raion was officially abolished on 18 July 2020 as part of the administrative reform of Ukraine, which reduced the number of raions of Luhansk Oblast to eight. However, the raion had not been under the control of the Ukrainian government since 2014, when it was taken by separatist forces, becoming part of the Luhansk People's Republic which continues using it as an administrative unit. 

Since the 2022 annexation referendums in Russian-occupied Ukraine, Russia has claimed the territory as theirs.

History 
Since 2014, the raion has been controlled by forces of the Luhansk People's Republic. On 7 October 2014, to facilitate the governance of Luhansk Oblast, the Verkhovna Rada on 7 October 2014 made some changes in the administrative divisions, so that the localities in the government-controlled areas were grouped into districts. In particular, the urban-type settlement of Chornukhyne was transferred from Perevalsk Raion to Popasna Raion.

Demographics 
As of the 2001 Ukrainian census:

Ethnicity
 Ukrainians: 56.7%
 Russians: 40.6%
 Belarusians: 1.1%

References

Former raions of Luhansk Oblast
 
1965 establishments in Ukraine
Ukrainian raions abolished during the 2020 administrative reform